Cornelius is an originally Roman masculine name. Its derivation is uncertain but is suspected to be from the Latin cornu, "horn".

Cornelius as a surname
 Aaron Cornelius (born 1990), Australian rules footballer
 Alvin Robert Cornelius (1903–1991), Pakistani jurist and politician
 Andreas Cornelius (born 1993), Danish footballer
 Bernard Cornelius (1919–1987), English cricketer
 Billy Cornelius (1898–?), English footballer
 Carter Cornelius (1948–1991), American politician
 Charles Cornelius (born 1945), Indian field hockey player
 Charles Cornelius (gridiron football) (born 1952), American football player
 Cleighton Cornelius (born 1976), New Zealand cricketer
 Dean Cornelius (born 2001), Scottish footballer
 Deborah Cornelius, British actress
 Derek Cornelius (born 1997), Canadian soccer player
 Don Cornelius (1936–2012), the creator and first host of Soul Train
 Eddie Cornelius, American gospel singer
 Elias Cornelius (1794–1832), American missionary
 Everton Cornelius (born 1955), Antigua and Barbuda sprinter
 George Cornelius (Secretary), American politician
 Hans Cornelius (1863–1947), German philosopher
 Helen Cornelius (born 1941), American singer-songwriter and actress
 Ingeborg Cornelius (born 1930), Austrian actress
 Jacob Cornelius (born 1984), American rower
 Jemalle Cornelius (born 1984), American football player
 Johanna Cornelius (1912–1974), Afrikaner activist and trade unionist
 Kathy Cornelius (born 1932), American golfer
 Keenan Cornelius (born 1992), American Brazilian Jiu-Jitsu and MMA fighter
 Keithroy Cornelius (born 1968), U.S. Virgin Islands cricketer and footballer
 Lloyd Cornelius (born 1943), Guyanese cricketer
 Michael G. Cornelius, American academic and author
 Nelarine Cornelius (born 1957), British academic
 Norman Cornelius (1886–1963), English cricketer
 Patricia Cornelius, Australian playwright
 Peter Cornelius (disambiguation), multiple people
 Reid Cornelius (born 1970), American baseball player and coach
 Robert Cornelius (1809–1893), American photographer
 Stan Cornelius (1941–2005), American lawyer, politician and record producer
 Taylor Cornelius (born 1995), American football player
 Thomas R. Cornelius (1827–1899), American politician
 Tiffany Cornelius (born 1989), Luxembourgish tennis player
 Troy Cornelius (born 1983), Guyanese cricketer
 Wade Cornelius (born 1978), New Zealand cricketer
 Wanda Cornelius, American politician
 Wayne A. Cornelius (born 1945), American political scientist and academic

Cornelius as a given name
 Cornelius (musician), stage name of Japanese recording artist and producer Keigo Oyamada
 Corneille (singer), stage name of Cornelius Nyungura, German-born Québécois rhythm and blues singer
 Cornelius Agrippa, 15th-century German magician and cabalist
 Cornelius W. Armstrong (1827–after 1872), New York politician
 Cornelius Bennett, American football player
 Cornelius Boza-Edwards, Ugandan Super Featherweight boxing champion
 Cornelius M. Brosnan (1813–1867), Justice of the Supreme Court of Nevada
 Cornelius Burges, English minister
 Cornelius Cardew, English composer
 Cornelius the Centurion, considered by Christians to be the first Gentile converted
 Cornelius Castoriadis, Greek-French astronomer, philosopher
 Cornelius Crane Chase, better known under his stage name Chevy Chase, actor and comedian
 Cornelius Coe, American football player
 Cornelius Cole, Governor of California
 Cornelius P. Comegys, American farmer and politician
 Cornelius Fuscus, prefect of the Praetorian Guard
 Cornelius Edward Gallagher (1921–2018), American politician
 Cornelius Hankins (1863–1946), American painter
 Cornelius Hardy, Australian convict
 Cornelius Henry, Canadian cricketer
 Cornelius T. Herring (1849–1931), American rancher, banker and hotelier
 Cornelius Holland (regicide), regicide of Charles I of England
 Cornelius Holland (politician), United States Representative from Maine
 Cornelius Jakhelln, Norwegian musician
 Cornelius Johnson (athlete), African-American high jump athlete
 Cornelius L. Keedy, American pastor, physician, and academic administrator
 Cornelius Lanczos, Hungarian mathematician and physicist
 Cornelius Lysaght, horse racing correspondent
 Cornelius McGillicuddy Sr., better known as Connie Mack, baseball player, Philadelphia Athletics owner and manager
 Cornelius Harvey McGillicuddy III, better known as Connie Mack III, senator from Florida
 Cornelius Harvey McGillicuddy IV, better known as Connie Mack IV, congressman from Florida
 Cornelius Mwalwanda (died 2020), Malawian politician and economist
 Cornelius Nepos, Roman historian of Gaul
 Cornelius Pot, Dutch football coach
 Cornelius Roosevelt (1794–1871), American businessman
 Cornelius V. S. Roosevelt (1951–1991), American veteran
 Cornelius Ryan (1920–1974), author of The Longest Day and A Bridge Too Far
 Cornelio Saavedra, first President of Argentina 1810
 Cornelius Calvin Sale Jr., birth name of Robert Byrd, senator and congressman from West Virginia
 Cornelius "Corrie" Sanders, South African boxer
 Cornelius Sherlock (died 1888), British architect
 Cornelius Van Til, Dutch-American Christian philosopher, Reformed theologian, and presuppositional apologist
 Cornelius Vander Starr, American founder of AIG
 Cornelius Vanderbilt, American industrialist
 Cornelius Wiebe, Canadian physician and politician
 Cornelius Whitehouse (1796–1883), English engineer and inventor
 Pope Cornelius, pope from AD 251 to 253
 Metropolitan Cornelius, several people
 St. Cornelius (disambiguation), several saints

Fictional characters

Family name
 Abraham Cornelius, scientist in X-Men comics
 Doctor Cornelius, in C. S. Lewis's novel Prince Caspian
 Jerry Cornelius, in books by Michael Moorcock
 Yukon Cornelius, in Rudolph the Red-Nosed Reindeer (TV special)
 Cornelius, play by John Boynton Priestley
 Father Vito Cornelius, a priest in The Fifth Element movie

Given name
 Cornelius (Planet of the Apes), from the Planet of the Apes film series
 Cornelius, an old elephant counsellor from the Babar the Elephant children's books and animated TV series
 Prince Cornelius, faery prince from the 1994 film Thumbelina
 Cornelius, an alias used by The Narrator in Fight Club
 Cornelius Coot, in the Scrooge McDuck universe
 Cornelius Fillmore, in the animated series Fillmore!
 Cornelius Fudge, from the Harry Potter series
 Gibby Cornelius Gibson, one of the main characters of Nickelodeon's iCarly
 Cornelius Hackl from the musical Hello, Dolly!
 Cornelius "Cory" Matthews, the main character of Boy Meets World
 Lewis "Cornelius" Robinson, the adult character of Lewis in Meet the Robinsons
 Cornelius Stirk, in the DC Universe
 Cornelius Austerlin, the stepdad in Lene Kaaberbøl's books about Katriona
 Cornelius, an elderly ant in the 1998 film A Bug's Life

See also
 Cornelia (name), the feminine version of the name
 Cornelis, a Dutch version of the name
 Cornelius (disambiguation), for other meanings

References

Latin masculine given names